The Oxford Bar is a public house situated on Young Street, in the New Town of Edinburgh, Scotland. The pub is chiefly notable for having been featured in Ian Rankin's Inspector Rebus series of novels. The Oxford Bar, or The Ox, is John Rebus's favourite pub in Edinburgh.

History
The Oxford Bar apparently became a public house in 1811, although it was a confectioner's shop in 1843. It was disponed on 30 October 1893 to Andrew Wilson, wines and spirits merchant, and thereafter remained a public bar.

The Oxford Bar retains its original compartmentalised form, which many other local bars have lost.  Originally consisting of a central corridor with rooms to right and left, the corridor has been opened up to the left with an archway into the small stand-up bar but the original form is still clear.

It is a Category B listed building.

Patrons
Several Scottish writers and artists are also said to have been patrons of the Oxford Bar, including Sydney Goodsir Smith and Willie Ross. In fact, the pub was first immortalised in Smith's Carotid Cornucopius. Ian Rankin is also a patron of the Oxford Bar, and chose it as Rebus's pub because a lot of police officers drink there. In Dirty Work: Ian Rankin and John Rebus Book-By-Book, Ray Dexter and Nadine Carr note that the Oxford Bar would be an improbable local for Rebus due to its geographical location.

Other visitors to the bar have included actor Sean Connery and author Colin Dexter.

Quintin Jardine's 2009 Bob Skinner novel, Fatal Last Words, also mentions the Oxford Bar considerably, again due to the connection with the local police force drinking there. There are a few other nods to Rankin too.

References

External links
 The Oxford Bar at Edinburgh Pub Guide

Tourist attractions in Edinburgh
Pubs in Edinburgh
Edinburgh in fiction
Category B listed buildings in Edinburgh
Listed pubs in Scotland